Antti Hyvärinen (born 26 November 1960) is a Finnish judoka. He competed in the men's lightweight event at the 1984 Summer Olympics.

References

External links
 

1960 births
Living people
Finnish male judoka
Olympic judoka of Finland
Judoka at the 1984 Summer Olympics
People from Kangasala
Sportspeople from Pirkanmaa